Largan (also Romanized as Lārgān and Lāregān) is a village in Oshtorjan Rural District, in the Central District of Falavarjan County, Isfahan Province, Iran. At the 2006 census, its population was 2,259, in 598 families.

References 

Populated places in Falavarjan County